Balzac is a hamlet in Rocky View County, which is in the Calgary Metropolitan Region of the Canadian province of Alberta.

The hamlet is located in census division No. 6 and in the Alberta federal electoral district of Banff—Airdrie (formerly in the federal electoral district of Wild Rose).

As of July 31, 2007, Balzac is immediately adjacent to Calgary's northern city limits. Balzac is also directly west of the CrossIron Mills shopping mall.

History
A Canadian Pacific Railway station began operating at Balzac in 1910. It was named by William Cornelius Van Horne, then president of the Canadian Pacific Railway, after one of his favourite authors, Honoré de Balzac (1799–1850) a noted French novelist. The post office here was opened on April 1, 1912 under the name "Beddington" and was changed on July 1, 1925. The first warehouse was built in 1916, mostly for coal.  Canadian Senator and senate reform advocate Bert Brown hails from Balzac.

Demographics 
The population of Balzac according to the 2006 municipal census conducted by Rocky View County is 1.

Economy 
 Balzac General Store (with restaurant and gas station)
 Although not officially located within Balzac, the hamlet is immediately adjacent to the CrossIron Mills shopping centre, which is the largest single-level mall in Alberta. The business park surrounding the mall, which opened in 2009, saw the addition of a horse-racing track and casino in 2015, and is earmarked for an equestrian college campus and other businesses. The mall and surrounding businesses are officially within the County of Rocky View, but the mall and business park is often referred to as being in Balzac because of its proximity to the hamlet.
 In early 2009, Wal-mart announced plans to spend  million ($104.4 US million) to build a  distribution center in the business park east of Balzac. The facility opened in late 2010 and acts as a distribution hub for fresh food in Western Canada.
 In late 2017 Amazon agreed to locate a  distribution center. The facility is estimated to create 750 permanent jobs. According to Amazon's director of Canadian operations, Glenn Sommerville the location's proximity of the Calgary International Airport is optimal for faster shipping.
The company Enterra has secured $30M to establish a breeding facility of insects such as the soldier black fly as a source for high protein animal feed. The facility will employ 30 staff and be operational in 2019.
 New Horizon Mall
 In January 2022 Westgen moved its EPOD manufacturing operations to a shop in the Wagon Wheel Industrial Park, east of the hamlet.

Media
Due to its close proximity to both Calgary and Airdrie, Balzac receives most media (television, radio, newspapers) from those two cities.

Balzac Billy, a Groundhog Day prognosticator, resides in the town, and is considered one of Canada's most prominent forecasting groundhogs (Shubenacadie Sam and Wiarton Willie being among the others).

See also 
List of communities in Alberta
List of hamlets in Alberta

References

External links
Rocky View County's official website
Rocky View County's community profile on Alberta First
Calgary-Edmonton Corridor in Alberta

Rocky View County
Hamlets in Alberta
Calgary Region